In 2005, an international conference titled Avoiding Dangerous Climate Change: A Scientific Symposium on Stabilisation of Greenhouse Gases examined the link between atmospheric greenhouse gas concentration and global warming  and its effects.  The conference name was derived from Article 2 of the charter for the United Nations Framework Convention on Climate Change  The conference explored the possible impacts at different levels of greenhouse gas emissions and how the climate might be stabilized at a desired level.  The conference took place under the United Kingdom's presidency of the G8, with the participation of around 200 "internationally renowned" scientists from 30 countries. It was chaired by Dennis Tirpak and hosted by the Hadley Centre for Climate Prediction and Research in Exeter, from 1 February to 3 February.
The conference was one of many meetings leading up to the 2015 Paris Agreement, at which the international community agreed to limit global warming to no more than 2ºC in order to have a 50-50 chance of avoiding dangerous climate change.  However, a 2018 published study points at a threshold at which temperatures could rise to 4 or 5 degrees through self-reinforcing feedbacks in the climate system, suggesting the threshold (or 'tipping point') is below the 2 degree temperature target.

Objectives

The conference was called to bring together the latest research into what would be necessary to achieve the objective of the 1992 United Nations Framework Convention on Climate Change:
to achieve, in accordance with the relevant provisions of the Convention, stabilization of greenhouse gas concentrations in the atmosphere at a level that would prevent dangerous anthropogenic interference with the climate system.

It was also intended to encourage further research in the area. In the 2001 IPCC Third Assessment Report, an initial assessment of the subject had been included; however, the topic had received relatively little international discussion.

Specifically, the conference explored three issues:
For different levels of climate change what are the key impacts, for different regions and sectors and for the world as a whole?
What would such levels of climate change imply in terms of greenhouse gas stabilisation concentrations and emission pathways required to achieve such levels?
What options are there for achieving stabilisation of greenhouse gases at different stabilisation concentrations in the atmosphere, taking into account costs and uncertainties?

Conclusions
Among the conclusions reached, the most significant was a new assessment of the link between the concentration of greenhouse gases in the atmosphere and the increase in global temperature levels. Some researchers have argued that the most serious consequences of global warming might be avoided if global average temperatures rose by no more than 2 °C (3.6 °F) above pre-industrial levels (1.4 °C above present levels). It had generally been assumed that this would occur if greenhouse gas concentrations rose above 550 ppm carbon dioxide equivalent by volume. This concentration was, for example, informing government in certain countries, including the European Union.

The conference concluded that, at the level of 550 ppm, it was likely that 2 °C would be exceeded, according to the projections of more recent climate models. Stabilising greenhouse gas concentrations at 450 ppm  would only result in a 50% likelihood of limiting global warming to 2 °C, and that it would be necessary to achieve stabilisation below 400 ppm to give a relatively high certainty of not exceeding 2 °C.

The conference also claimed that, if action to reduce emissions is delayed by 20 years, rates of emission reduction may need to be 3 to 7 times greater to meet the same temperature target.

Reaction
As a result of changing opinion on the 'safe' atmospheric concentration of greenhouse gases, to which this conference contributed, the UK government changed the target in the Climate Change Act from 60% to 80% by 2050.

See also

4 Degrees and Beyond International Climate Conference
Action on climate change
Climate change mitigation scenarios
Environmental impact of aviation
Hypermobility (travel)
Index of climate change articles

References

Further reading
Related book: Avoiding Dangerous Climate Change, Editors: Hans Joachim Schellnhuber, Wolfgang Cramer, Nebojsa Nakicenovic, Tom Wigley, and Gary Yohe, Cambridge University Press, February 2006, .

External links

Tyndall Centre - A strategic assessment of scientific and behavioural perspectives on 'dangerous' climate change
WWF-UK - 2°C Is Too Much! Evidence and Implications of Dangerous Climate Change in the Arctic
Netherlands Environmental Assessment Agency - Meeting the European Union 2°C climate target: global and regional emission implications

News
April 19, 2007, Reuters: World needs to axe greenhouse gases by 80 pct: report
February 1, 2006, Euractive: UK chief scientific adviser: Keeping CO2 concentration below 450ppm is 'unfeasible'
January 30, 2006, BBC: Stark warning over climate change
January 30, 2006, BBC: Climate report: the main points
January 29, 2006, Washington Post: Debate on Climate Shifts to Issue of Irreparable Change
January 1, 2006, Times online: World has only 20 years to stop climate disaster
February 3, 2005, Guardian Unlimited: Climate conference hears degree of danger

Climate change conferences
2005 in the environment